Greig Henderson (born c. 1951) is a Scottish curler and curling coach.

Personal life
Henderson is married and has two children. He is employed as a farmer.

Awards
Collie Campbell Memorial Award: 1980

Teams

Record as a coach of national teams

References

External links
 

Living people
1950s births
Scottish male curlers
European curling champions
Scottish curling champions
Scottish curling coaches